

Stirling-Hamilton baronets, of Preston, Haddington (5 November 1673)
Sir William Hamilton, 1st Baronet (–)
Sir Robert Hamilton, 2nd Baronet (1650–1701)
Sir Robert Hamilton, 3rd Baronet (died )
Sir William Hamilton, 4th Baronet (6 March 1681 – 25 May 1749)
Sir Robert Hamilton, 5th Baronet (1714–1756)
Sir William Hamilton, 6th Baronet (1748–1756)
Sir John Hamilton, 7th Baronet ( – 1778)
Sir Robert Hamilton, 8th Baronet (1754 – 8 June 1799)
Sir William Stirling Hamilton, 9th Baronet (1788 – 6 May 1856)
Sir William Stirling-Hamilton, 10th Baronet (17 September 1830 – 26 September 1913)
Sir William Stirling-Hamilton, 11th Baronet (4 December 1868 – 7 October 1946)
Sir Robert William Stirling-Hamilton, 12th Baronet (5 April 1903 – 14 February 1982)
Sir Bruce Stirling-Hamilton, 13th Baronet (5 August 1940 – 17 September 1989)
Sir Malcolm William Bruce Stirling-Hamilton, 14th Baronet (born 6 August 1979)

See also
Hamilton baronets
Stirling baronets

References

Stirling-Hamilton
1673 establishments in Nova Scotia